Michael Cunningham (born 10 March 2001) is a Scottish footballer who plays as a forward for Cowdenbeath, on loan from East Fife.

Career

Dundee 
Cunningham made his debut for Dundee in the Scottish League Cup, coming off the bench in a game against Peterhead. He made his league debut in January 2020 against Inverness Caledonian Thistle.

At the end of January, Cunningham joined Lowland Football League side Cumbernauld Colts on loan. In his shortened time there due to the COVID-19 pandemic, Cunningham impressed, scoring 3 goals in 5 games, before returning to his parent club.

In October 2020, Cunningham joined Edinburgh City on loan. He made his debut for The Citizens in a 1–5 win against Brechin City.

Cunningham would leave Dundee at the conclusion of his contract in 2021.

East Fife 
In July 2021, after a successful trial period, Cunningham signed for local Scottish League One side East Fife.
On 9 February 2022, Michael was awarded a contract extension at East Fife until summer 2023. Cunningham scored his first goal for the club in August 2022, in a Scottish Challenge Cup victory over St Johnstone B.

In November 2022, Cunningham signed a one-year extension with East Fife and joined Lowland League club Cowdenbeath on loan for the rest of the season.

Career Statistics

References 

Living people
2001 births
Scottish footballers
Dundee F.C. players
Cumbernauld Colts F.C. players
F.C. Edinburgh players
Scottish Professional Football League players
Lowland Football League players
Association football forwards
East Fife F.C. players
Cowdenbeath F.C. players